The Ferguson-Florissant School District (FFSD) is a public school district located in Greater St. Louis and in Missouri. Its headquarters are in Hazelwood. The district covers all or part of 11 municipalities, serving more than 11,000 students from preschool through 12th grade.

FFSD operates 17 elementary schools, four middle schools (one a STEAM and Gifted Academy), three A+ and NCA-CASI-accredited high schools and an alternative school.  It also offers a comprehensive early education program, the Challenger Learning Center space education facility and the Little Creek Nature Area, a 97-acre nature preserve used for experiential learning on subjects such as biology, ecology and related areas of science.

History
On June 7, 1975, a U.S. district court ordered FFSD to annex the Berkeley School District and the Kinloch School District; therefore, the Ferguson-Florissant district began to serve Berkeley and Kinloch.

In 2004, Berkeley High School closed, replaced by McCluer South-Berkeley High School.

On December 8, 2010, the Board of Education named Dr. Art J. McCoy, II as Superintendent. He was the first African-American superintendent for the school district and at age 33 was one of the youngest in the state of Missouri and nation.

On Jan. 30, 2015, the Board of Education unanimously approved Dr. Joseph Davis as superintendent of schools, effective July 1.

In 2018 the district formally closed its previous administration building, which it already moved out from. On a 4-2 vote, in which board members of different ethnic backgrounds voted different ways, the district closed or moved a different program into Airport Elementary, Mark Twain Alternative, and Vogt Elementary schools and converted McCluer South into a selective STEAM school.

Operations
Previously the district headquarters were in Florissant.

Schools
 High schools
 McCluer High School
 McCluer North High School
 STEAM Academy at McCluer South-Berkeley, formerly McCluer South-Berkeley High School

 Middle schools
 Cross Keys Middle School
 Ferguson Middle School
 STEAM Academy Middle School

 Sixth grade centers
 Johnson-Wabash Sixth Grade Center, formerly Johnson-Wabash Elementary School
 Wedgewood Sixth Grade Center, formerly Wedgwood Elementary School

 Intermediate schools (grades 3-5)
 Berkeley Elementary School
 Combs Elementary School
 Griffith Elementary School
 Halls Ferry Elementary School
 Lee-Hamilton Elementary School
 Robinwood Elementary School

 Primary schools (grades PreK-2)
 Bermuda Elementary School
 Central Elementary School
 Commons Lane Elementary School
 Duchesne Elementary School
 Holman Elementary School
 Parker Road Elementary School
 Walnut Grove Elementary School

 Alternative Programs
 Mark Twain Restoration and Re-Entry Center - Was Mark Twain Student Support Center until 2019

 Former schools
 Airport Elementary School - Closed 2019
 Berkeley Middle School
 Cool Valley Elementary School
 Vogt Elementary School - Closed 2019

Students who are differently abled are referred to the Special School District of St. Louis County (SSD) facilities. Ferguson-Florrisant residents are zoned to Ackerman School (ages 5-13) and Northview High School (ages 14-21) in Florissant. The SSD district also maintains North Technical High School in Florissant.

References

External links

  Ferguson-Florissant School District
  - Archive of the school district's previous domain

School districts in Missouri
Education in St. Louis County, Missouri